is a mountain located on the boundary of Okuwa, Iijima and Miyada, Nagano Prefecture, in the Chūbu region of Japan. It is also included on the list of "100 Famous Japanese Mountains."

Hiking 
The landscape of Mt. Utsugi includes large granite boulders surrounded by lush greenery. Due to its distance and elevation gain it is usually completed as an overnight hike. The trail begins in the town of Komagane which is also popular for its onsen and the Komagatake Ropeway.

Gallery

External links

https://www.hikemasterjapan.com/utsugi

Kiso Mountains
Japan Alps
Utsugi